Shri R. K. Parikh Arts & Science College, established in 1946, is one of the oldest general degree colleges in Dantali Road, Anand, Gujarat. It  is affiliated to Gujarat University and offers undergraduate courses in science and arts.
now affiliated with sardar patel University

.shri r.k.parikh arts and science College now add b.sc. with computer science in their syllabus. PGDCA also available in this College.

r.k.parikh arts and science College

Departments

Science

Chemistry
Physics 
Mathematics
Computer Science
Microbiology
Botany

Arts 

English
Gujarati
Economics
Sociology
Sanskrit
Psychology

Accreditation
Shri R. K. Parikh Arts & Science College was accredited by the National Assessment and Accreditation Council (NAAC).

References

External links

Colleges affiliated to Gujarat University
Universities and colleges in Gujarat
Gujarat University
Educational institutions established in 1946
1946 establishments in India